Juiaparus batus is a species of beetle in the family Cerambycidae.

References

Cerambycini
Beetles described in 1758
Taxa named by Carl Linnaeus